Hello Cruel World is the third studio album by Sole and the Skyrider Band. It was released on Fake Four Inc. on July 19, 2011. Music videos were created for "Napoleon", "D.I.Y.", "Hello Cruel World", "Bad Captain Swag", and "Immortality".

Critical reception

At Metacritic, which assigns a weighted average score out of 100 to reviews from mainstream critics, the album received an average score of 66, based on 6 reviews, indicating "generally favorable reviews".

Tom Briehan of Pitchfork gave the album a 6.1 out of 10, stating that "Sole has largely curbed his frantic, out-of-control, sometimes-arrhythmic rap style, going for a measured and controlled thing instead." David Jeffries of AllMusic gave the album 3.5 stars out of 5, writing, "the album's title references Sole's desire to bring the underground angst to the masses, injecting a little ugliness and art into your everyday programming." Thomas Quinlan of Exclaim! said, "While it's unlikely Hello Cruel World will reach far beyond Sole's current fan base, it should continue to impress those who are already fans, offering a slightly different perspective on the unorthodox MC."

Westword included it on the "Denver's Best Music Releases of 2011" list.

Track listing

Personnel
Credits adapted from liner notes.

Sole and the Skyrider Band
 Tim Holland – vocals, lyrics
 Bud Berning – programming, production, arrangement
 William Ryan Fritch – instrumentation, vocals, arrangement
 John Wagner – drum programming, production

Additional musicians
 Xiu Xiu – vocals (1), lyrics (1)
 Lil B – vocals (5), lyrics (5)
 Pictureplane – vocals (5), lyrics (5)
 Ceschi – vocals (6, 12), lyrics (6, 12)
 Noah23 – vocals (6), lyrics (6)
 Pedestrian – lyrics (8)
 Sage Francis – vocals (11), lyrics (11)
 Isaiah Toothtaker – vocals (12), lyrics (12)
 Mestizo – vocals (12), lyrics (12)

Technical personnel
 Jesse O'Brien – mixing
 Tom Capek – mastering
 Lando – cover art
 Michael Crigler – art direction, design
 The Raincoat Man – vinyl layout

References

External links
 

2011 albums
Fake Four Inc. albums
Sole and the Skyrider Band albums